The Flint United are a professional basketball team in Flint, Michigan, and members of The Basketball League (TBL).

History
On September 18, 2020, it was announced that Flint, Michigan would be awarded a franchise for the upcoming 2021 TBL season. The team is owned by Flint native Kevin Mays, who has experience in sports marketing and development, among different organizations. Mays played a key role for two successful Flint sports franchises: the Flint Firebirds and the Flint City Bucks. Flint native Matt Washington was named the team's general manager.  On November 16. 2020, Charlie Bell was named as the team's inaugural head coach. 
  On November 17, 2021, Keno Davis was named as the new head coach.

Flint hosted a professional basketball team called the Flint Fuze in 2001 and the Flint Pros between the years of 1972–1974 in the Continental Basketball Association.

References

Sports in Flint, Michigan
The Basketball League teams
Basketball teams established in 2020
Basketball teams in Michigan
2020 establishments in Michigan